Mount Riverview is a town off the Great Western Highway about 2 km NE of Blaxland in the Lower Blue Mountains, New South Wales, 70 kilometres west of Sydney, Australia. At the 2006 census, Mount Riverview had a population of 2,993 people.

Mount Riverview borders the townships/suburbs of Warrimoo, Blaxland, Emu Heights and Yellow Rock.

Mount Riverview has views over the Sydney area, including of Centrepoint Tower some 55 kilometres away. It has a general store, two churches, a wood turning and woodcraft centre, a public school, tennis courts, a water tank, a Chinese restaurant, two parks and a local fire brigade under the jurisdiction of the New South Wales Rural Fire Service.

Mount Riverview is part of the Federal Electoral Division of Macquarie (NSW).

Rural fire brigade
The Mount Riverview Rural Fire Brigade is the local fire service for the township of Mount Riverview. Mount Riverview is a residential town within the Blue Mountains, 74 kilometres west of Sydney situated within the Blue Mountains National Park.
The Mount Riverview Rural Fire Brigade is a Brigade member of the New South Wales Rural Fire Service and was officially started on Thursday 12 December 1968 under the title 'Mount Riverview Bush Fire Brigade' becoming fully operational in 1969. In 1997, the brigade was renamed (following the introduction of the Rural Fires Act) to the Mount Riverview Volunteer Rural Fire Brigade.

The brigade has 30 active, 17 life and a small group of ordinary members. It operates under the administration of the Blue Mountains Rural Fire District operating from the Central East Region.

One of its most notable calls to action was during the Black Christmas bushfires. The Black Christmas were bushfires that burnt for almost three weeks from 24 December 2001 across New South Wales, being the longest continuous bushfire emergency in state history. More than 170 firefighters worked for several days to protect the tiny township of Mount Riverview as it was encircled by bushfires . The brigade also supplied several crews and specialist equipment to assist during the 2003 Canberra bushfires which caused damage to the outskirts of Canberra, the Australian capital city.

The brigade is a participant in the New South Wales Rural Fire Service FireWise program. The brigade has two fire fighting appliances as well as a personnel carrier. Its heaviest vehicle is known as 'Riverview 1', and is a Category 1 (Cat 1) tanker. It falls in the 'heavy appliance' category and is capable of holding 3300 litres of water. The brigade also has a secondary appliance called 'Riverview 7' which is a dual cab Category 7 tanker, and a personnel carrier (callsign 'Riverview PC') which is capable of carrying up to 10 individuals including driver. It also maintains an 'air base operations support trailer' to assist with establishing and running air base operations during operations requiring helicopter support.

Several brigade members are specially trained members that form part of the Remote Area Firefighting Team (RAFT) program and are able to deploy at a moments notice across the state.

Sports

Mount Riverview is home to the Mt Riv Renegades basketball team as part of the Springwood Basketball Association competition. Established in early 2003, the Mt Riv Renegades started as a small basketball team playing in the Springwood and Districts Basketball Association (SDBA) domestic competition at the Blaxland High School Sports Centre. Team members consist of players who have attended Mount Riverview Primary School or who reside or have previously resided in the Mount Riverview area.

Mount Riverview is also the home of test cricketer Patrick Cummins, whose debut in South Africa during November 2011 saw him take six wickets in an innings and hitting the winning runs in a Man of the Match performance.

Local schools 
There are six local schools around Mount Riverview. Public schools include:
 Mount Riverview primary
 Blaxland primary
 Blaxland East Public School
 Blaxland High
 Wycliffe Christian School
 St Finbars Catholic Primary School

Notable residents
 Pat Cummins, Australian cricketer and incumbent Test captain

Notes and references

External links
 Mount Riverview Public School (archived 2005)
 Official Brigade photo website (archived 2007)
 Mt Riverview Black Christmas 2001 bushfire photos

Towns in New South Wales
Suburbs of the City of Blue Mountains